is a people mover station in Sakura, Chiba Prefecture, Japan. It is on the Yamaman Yūkarigaoka Line, serving the planned community of Yūkarigaoka. Trains run roughly every 20 minutes.

After Kōen Station, the Yūkarigaoka Line splits into two and forms a loop. Trains headed towards the loop section proceed to Joshidai Station, while trains returning from the loop proceed to Chiku Center Station.

Gallery

Adjacent stations

References

Railway stations in Chiba Prefecture
Railway stations in Japan opened in 1982